Petra De Sutter (Oudenaarde, 10 June 1963) is a Belgian gynaecologist and politician, currently serving as federal Deputy Prime Minister.

A member of the Groen party, she was previously a Member of the European Parliament from 2019 until 2020, when she was named Deputy PM with the responsibility of overseeing Belgium's public administration and public enterprises in Alexander De Croo's government. She is the first transgender minister in Europe.

Before entering into politics, she worked as professor of gynaecology at Ghent University, serving as head of the Department of Reproductive Medicine at Ghent University Hospital (UZ Gent).

Early life and education 
De Sutter was born in Oudenaarde, in the Flemish province of East Flanders, in 1963. She graduated from Ghent University with a medical degree in 1987 and with a PhD in biomedicine in 1991.

Medical career 
After graduating in 1991, De Sutter moved to the United States, spending two years studying oocyte genetics in Chicago. In 1994, she earned a specialisation in gynaecology. In 2000, she was named Professor in Reproductive Medicine at Gent University. In 2006, she was named Head of the Department for Reproductive Medicine of Gent University Hospital.

Political career

Member of the Senate, 2014–2019
In the 2014 European elections, De Sutter was second on the list for the Flemish Green party. However, while the party gained votes, it missed its hold on an additional second seat. She was subsequently co-opted by her party for a seat in the Belgian Senate. As a trans woman, she became the first openly transgender Belgian to be on a party election list.

In addition to her role in the Senate, De Sutter served as member of the Belgian delegation to the Parliamentary Assembly of the Council of Europe from 2014 until 2019. As member of the Socialists, Democrats and Greens Group, she was a member of the Committee on Migration, Refugees and Displaced Persons; the Committee on Rules of Procedure, Immunities and Institutional Affairs; the Sub-Committee on Integration; the Sub-Committee on Public Health and Sustainable Development; and the Sub-Committee on Ethics. She served as the Assembly's rapporteur on children's rights in relation to surrogacy arrangements (2016); on the use of new genetic technologies in human beings (2017); and on the conditions of reception of refugees and migrants (2018).

Since her political debut, De Sutter has tackled important issues: a regulation for surrogacy at a Belgian and European level, independent clinical research in the pharmaceutical industry, the risks of TTIP for consumer's protection of food and chemicals, and standing up for rights for LGBT people.

Member of the European Parliament, 2019–2020

On 15 September 2018 it was announced De Sutter was seeking nomination as one of the European Greens two lead candidates for the 2019 European Parliament elections, which eventually fell down to the Dutch Bas Eickhout and the German Ska Keller. After joining the Parliament, she chaired the Committee on the Internal Market and Consumer Protection; she was the first Green politician in this position. In 2020, she also joined the Special Committee on Beating Cancer.

In addition to her committee assignments, De Sutter was part of the Parliament's delegation for relations with the countries of South Asia (Bangladesh, Bhutan, the Maldives, Nepal, Pakistan and Sri Lanka). She was also a member of the European Parliament Intergroup on LGBT Rights and co-chaired the MEPs Against Cancer group.

In December 2020, De Sutter received the Justice & Gender Equality award at The Parliament Magazine's annual MEP Awards, in recognition of her work as an MEP on sexual and reproductive rights.

Deputy Prime Minister of Belgium, 2020–present
On 1 October 2020, De Sutter was sworn in as one of seven deputy prime ministers in the government of Prime Minister Alexander De Croo, becoming Europe's first transgender deputy prime minister, and the most senior trans politician in Europe.

Other activities
 Friends of Europe, Member of the Board of Trustees (since 2020)

References

1963 births
Living people
People from Oudenaarde
Groen (political party) politicians
Members of the Senate (Belgium)
Transgender politicians
Transgender women
Belgian transgender people
21st-century Belgian women politicians
MEPs for Belgium 2019–2024
LGBT members of the European Parliament
Women government ministers of Belgium
Gynaecologists
Ghent University alumni
Belgian women academics
Belgian LGBT politicians
Belgian senators of the 56th legislature